Jerta Schir (born 12 June 1938) is an Italian alpine skier. She competed in three events at the 1960 Winter Olympics. She is the sister of the other skier Jolanda Schir.

References

External links
 

1938 births
Living people
Italian female alpine skiers
Olympic alpine skiers of Italy
Alpine skiers at the 1960 Winter Olympics
Sportspeople from Trentino